Sulphide Street railway station was the terminus of the Silverton Tramway in New South Wales, Australia. It served the city of Broken Hill.

History
Sulphide Street station opened on 2 January 1889 as the terminus of the Silverton Tramway from Cockburn. In 1905, a new station building was built. From 1891 until 1929 Sulphide Street was also served by the Tarrawingee Tramway. The station closed on 9 January 1970 when the Silverton Tramway was replaced with the standard gauge line extended to South Australia via Broken Hill station.

The station reopened in the late 1970s as a museum. Among the exhibits are Silverton Rail locomotives Y1 and W24, South Australian Railways T181 and a Silver City Comet set. The station can be seen in the cult 1971 film Wake in Fright

References

External links

Disused regional railway stations in New South Wales
Railway museums in New South Wales
Railway stations in Australia opened in 1889
Railway stations closed in 1970
Silverton Tramway